Dorothy Tennant, Lady Stanley (22 March 1855 – 5 October 1926) was an English painter of the Victorian era neoclassicism. She was married to explorer Sir Henry Morton Stanley.

Biography
Tennant was born in Russell Square, London, the second daughter of Charles Tennant and Gertrude Barbara Rich Collier (1819–1918). Her sister was the photographer, Eveleen Tennant Myers.  She studied painting under Edward Poynter at the Slade School of Fine Art, London and with Jean-Jacques Henner in Paris. She first exhibited at the Royal Academy in 1886 and subsequently at the New Gallery and the Grosvenor Gallery in London. Outside of London Tennant featured in exhibitions by the Fine Art Society in Glasgow and also in the Autumn Exhibitions held in Liverpool and Manchester.

In 1890, she married Sir Henry Morton Stanley, and became known as Lady Stanley.  She edited her husband's autobiography, reportedly removing any references to other women in Stanley's life. After Sir Henry Morton Stanley's death, his widow remarried, in 1907, to Henry Jones Curtis (died 19 February 1944), a pathologist, surgeon and writer.

Lady Stanley was also an author and illustrator, including London Street Arabs in 1890.

She died of heart failure on 5 October 1926.

Works

Bibliography
 London Street Arabs (London: Cassell & Co., 1890); Google books,  archive.org

References

 Chapman-Huston, Desmond, "The Lost Historian, A Memoir of Sir Sidney Low", London: John Murray, 1936

External links

 
 
 
 Stanley, Henry, The Autobiography of Sir Henry Morton Stanley, London: Sampson, 1909

1855 births
1926 deaths
19th-century English painters
20th-century English painters
19th-century English women artists
20th-century English women artists
Alumni of the Slade School of Fine Art
Artists from London
British neoclassical painters
English women painters
People from Bloomsbury
Wives of knights